The Gatton, Lockyer and Brisbane Valley Star is a free weekly online newspaper in Gatton, Queensland, Australia.

History 
The newspaper was first published on 28 September 1956 under the title Gatton Star.

Along with many other regional Australian newspapers owned by NewsCorp, the Gatton Star ceased print editions in June 2020 and became an online-only publication.

References 

Newspapers published in Queensland
Gatton, Queensland
Online newspapers with defunct print editions
1956 establishments in Australia
Publications established in 1956
Weekly newspapers published in Australia